Jeffrey Dean Twitty (born November 10, 1957) is a former Major League Baseball pitcher who played for one season. He pitched for the Kansas City Royals for 13 games during the 1980 season.

Twitty attended Anderson College and the University of South Carolina. At South Carolina, he set a single-season school record with 10 saves. In 1978, he played collegiate summer baseball with the Hyannis Mets of the Cape Cod Baseball League, was named a league all-star, and helped Hyannis win the league title. He was selected by the Royals in the 25th round of the 1979 MLB Draft.

References

External links

1957 births
Living people
Kansas City Royals players
Anderson Trojans baseball players
Hyannis Harbor Hawks players
Baseball players from South Carolina
Major League Baseball pitchers
People from Lancaster, South Carolina
Durham Bulls players
Fort Myers Royals players
Jacksonville Suns players
Omaha Royals players
Richmond Braves players
Savannah Braves players
South Carolina Gamecocks baseball players